Antrodioxolanone is an anti-inflammatory alkyne isolated from Antrodia camphorata.

References

Carbonate esters
Oxygen heterocycles
Methoxy compounds